Cyprus has a subtropical climate - Mediterranean and semi-arid type (in the north-eastern part of island) - according to Köppen climate classification signes Csa and BSh, with very mild winters (on the coast) and warm to hot summers. Snow is possible only in the Troodos mountains in the central part of the island. Rain occurs mainly in winter, with summer being generally dry.

Temperatures 
Cyprus has one of the warmest climates and warmest winters in the Mediterranean part of the European Union. Generally, the warm season lasts about eight months. In the remaining four months of the year, the temperatures tend to remain mild, while sometimes exceeding  during the day. 

In the centre of the island (the highlands) the average temperature exceeds ). 
While large temperature fluctuations are rare on the coast, the centre of Cyprus has more variations – typically colder winters and hotter summers.

Temperature of sea 
In the seven months from May to November the average sea temperature exceeds .

Sunshine 
In winter, Cyprus receives an average of 5–6 hours of sunlight per day, half of the 12–13 hours experienced at the height of summer. This is about double that of cities in the northern half of Europe; for comparison, London has 1,461 hours. However, in winter there can be more than four times more sunshine; for comparison, London has 37 hours while coastal locations in Cyprus have around 180 hours of sunshine in December (that is, as much as in May in London).

Charts of selected locations

On the coast

Inland

Precipitation 
The higher mountain areas are cooler and moister than the rest of the island. Sharp frost also occurs in the higher districts, which are usually blanketed with snow during the first months of the year. Plains along the northern coast and in the Karpass Peninsula area average  of annual rainfall. The least rainfall occurs in the Mesaoria, with  a year. Variability in annual rainfall is characteristic for the island, however, and droughts are frequent and sometimes severe. Statistical analysis of rainfall in Cyprus reveals a decreasing trend of rainfall amounts in the last 30 years.

Rainfall in the warmer months contributes little or nothing to water resources and agriculture. Autumn and winter rainfall, on which agriculture and water supply generally depend, is somewhat variable from year to year.

Other information 

The Mediterranean climate, warm and rather dry, with rainfall mainly between November and March, favors agriculture. In general, the island experiences mild wet winters and dry hot summers. Variations in temperature and rainfall are governed by altitude and, to a lesser extent, distance from the coast. Hot, dry summers from mid-May to mid-September and rainy, rather changeable winters from November to mid-March are separated by short autumn and spring seasons.

In summer the island is mainly under the influence of a shallow trough of low pressure extending from the great continental depression centred over Western Asia. It is a season of high temperatures with almost cloudless skies.

In winter Cyprus is near the track of fairly frequent small depressions which cross the Mediterranean Sea from west to east between the continental anticyclone of Eurasia and the generally low pressure belt of North Africa.

Humidity 
Relative humidity of the air is on average between 60% and 80% in winter and between 40% and 60% in summer with even lower values over inland areas around midday. Fog is infrequent and visibility is generally very good. Sunshine is abundant during the whole year and particularly from April to September when the average duration of bright sunshine exceeds 11 hours per day.

Winds 
Winds are generally light to moderate and variable in direction. Strong winds may occur sometimes, but gales are infrequent over Cyprus and are mainly confined to exposed coastal areas as well as areas at high elevation.

Temperature and precipitation charts

See also
 Climate change in Cyprus

References 

Cyprus
Geography of Cyprus